This is a list of Montana suffragists, suffrage groups and others associated with the cause of women's suffrage in Montana.

Groups 
 Equal Suffrage Party, formed in 1897.
 Helena Business Women's Suffrage Club.
 Helena Equal Suffrage Club.
 Missoula Teachers' Suffrage Committee.
 Montana Equal Suffrage Association (MESA), created in 1912.
 Montana Men's Equal Suffrage League.
 Montana Woman's Suffrage Association (MWSA), formed in 1895.
 Women's Christian Temperance Union (WCTU).

Suffragists 

 Lillian Agnew (Great Falls).
Mary Long Alderson.
Mary B. Atwater.
 Ida Auerbach.
 Edith Clinch.
 Helen P. Clarke.
Eva Warren Collier (Bedford).
 Ota E. Cummings (Billings).
 Maria M. Dean (Helena).
 Ella Knowles Haskell (Helena).
 Maggie Smith Hathaway (Ravalli County).
 Hazel Hunkins (Billings).
 Emma Ingalls (Flathead County).
 Grace Rankin Kinney.
Mary Alderson Long.
 Clara McAdow (Fergus County).
 Mary E. O'Neill (Butte).
 Martha Edgerton Rolfe Plassmann (Great Falls).
Jeannette Rankin (Missoula County).
 Margaret Jane Steele Rozsa.
 Harriet P. Sanders.
 Sarepta Sanders (Helena).
 Mittie L. Shoup (Missoula).
 Gertrude Sylvester.
Jessie Thompson (Bozeman).
 Clara B. Tower.
 Josephine Trigg (Great Falls).
Elizabeth Donohue Vaughn (Great Falls).
Mary C. Wheeler (Helena).
 Belle Fligelman Winestine (Helena).

Politicians supporting women's suffrage 
 Joseph Burt Annin.
 Peter Breen.
 William A. Clark.
 John S. Huseby.
 Hiram Knowles.
 Perry McAdow (Fergus County).
 Wellington Rankin.
 Francis E. Sargeant.

Publications 
 The Suffrage Daily News, published in 1914 in Helena.
 Woman's Voice, published on suffrage in 1913.

Suffragists campaigning in Montana 
 Henry Blackwell.
 Kathryn Blake.
 Carrie Chapman Catt.
 Ida Craft.
 Emma Smith DeVoe.
 Laura A. Gregg.
 Mary Garrett Hay.
 Margaret Hinchey.
 Rosalie Jones.
 Harriet Burton Laidlaw.
 James Lees Laidlaw.
 Gail Laughlin.
 Anna Howard Shaw.
 Frances Willard.

Anti-suffragists 
Groups
 Montana Association Opposed to Woman Suffrage, formed in summer of 1914.
 Travel Club of Great Falls.

Politicians opposing women's suffrage
 Allen Joy.
 Martin Maginnis.
 George L. Ramsey (Gallatin County).
 Joseph K. Toole.

See also 
 Timeline of women's suffrage in Montana
 Women's suffrage in Montana
 Women's suffrage in the United States

References

Sources 
 
 
 
 
 
 

Montana suffrage

Montana suffragists
Activists from Montana
History of Montana
Suffragists